"Mixed Up World" is a song by British singer-songwriter Sophie Ellis-Bextor, released on 13 October 2003 as the first single from her second studio album, Shoot from the Hip (2003). The single includes a B-side called "The Earth Shook the Devil's Hand". "Mixed Up World peaked at number seven on the UK Singles Chart and was especially successful in Denmark, where it debuted and peaked at number three. It has sold 35,000 copies in the United Kingdom. The music video for the song features various dancers wearing a mix of bright and dark colours.

Music video
The music video, directed by Rupert Jones, features men in bowler hats as Ellis-Bextor moves between giant black and white punctuation marks. It was the first video that shows Sophie's blonde hairstyle. A short clip from the video was featured in an ad on Australia's VH1 channel in June 2006.

Track listings

UK CD single
 "Mixed Up World" – 3:49
 "Mixed Up World" (Groove Collision vocal mix) – 6:38
 "The Earth Shook the Devil's Hand" – 2:42
 "Mixed Up World" (CD Rom) – 3:49

UK cassette single
 "Mixed Up World" – 3:49
 "Mixed Up World" (Groove Collision vocal mix) – 6:38
 "The Earth Shook the Devil's Hand" – 2:42

European CD single
 "Mixed Up World" – 3:49
 "Mixed Up World" (Groove Collision vocal mix) – 6:38

European 12-inch single
A1. "Mixed Up World" (Groove Collision vocal mix)
B1. "Mixed Up World" (Groove Collision instrumental mix)
B2. "Mixed Up World" (radio edit)

Australian CD single
 "Mixed Up World" – 3:49
 "Take Me Home" (Sneaker Pimps remix) – 4:41
 "Murder on the Dancefloor" (Phunk Investigation vocal mix) – 8:34
 "Get Over You" (Almighty Pop'd Up mix) – 7:14
 "Music Gets the Best of Me" (Flip N Fill remix) – 6:05

Charts

Sales

|}

Release history

References

Sophie Ellis-Bextor songs
2003 singles
2003 songs
Polydor Records singles
Song recordings produced by Gregg Alexander
Songs written by Gregg Alexander
Songs written by Matt Rowe (songwriter)
Songs written by Sophie Ellis-Bextor